Godar Gardyal (also Romanized as Godār Gārdyāl) is a village in Mosaferabad Rural District, Rudkhaneh District, Rudan County, Hormozgan Province, Iran. At the 2006 census, its population was 15, in 4 families.

References 

Populated places in Rudan County